S. Rajeshkumar is an Indian politician and a member of the Legislative Assembly of Tamil Nadu in India. He represents the Killiyoor (state assembly constituency), which is in Kanyakumaridistrict, Tamil Nadu.

References

Living people
Indian National Congress politicians from Tamil Nadu
Tamil Nadu MLAs 2016–2021
Year of birth missing (living people)
Tamil Nadu MLAs 2021–2026